In mathematics, for a natural number , the nth Fibonacci group, denoted  or sometimes , is defined by n generators  and n relations:
 
 
 
 
 
 .

These groups were introduced by John Conway in 1965.

Kaplansky's unit conjecture

Giles Gardam disproved this conjecture in February 2021 by providing a counterexample. He took , the finite field with two elements, and he took  to be the 6th Fibonacci group . The non-trivial unit  he discovered has .

The 6th Fibonacci group  has also been variously referred to as the Hantzsche-Wendt group, the Passman group, and the Promislow group.

References

External links
An alternative proof that the Fibonacci group F(2,9) is infinite by Derek K. Holt (PostScript file).

Group theory
Ring theory